"Ooh La La" is a song recorded by American singer Britney Spears for the soundtrack of the 2013 family film The Smurfs 2. It was written and produced by Lukasz "Dr. Luke" Gottwald, Joshua "Ammo" Coleman, Henry "Cirkut" Walter, with additional writing from Bonnie McKee, Jacob Kasher Hindlin, Lola Blanc, and Fransisca Hall.

Background and production 
"Ooh La La" was written by Ammo, Fransisca Hall, and Lola Blanc, and was intended to become Blanc's debut single as it was a play on her name. However, upon the request of producer Dr. Luke, a deal was made in which Spears was allowed to record the track. He collaborated with additional writers Cirkut, Jacob Kasher, and Bonnie McKee to rewrite some lyrics into a more child-friendly nature. Production was handled by Dr. Luke, Cirkut, and Ammo. Spears decided to record this song to contribute to the soundtrack of The Smurfs 2 because, in her own words, she "always loved the Smurfs as a kid and now my boys are the biggest Smurfs fans EVER. I wanted to surprise them with a song in the movie. I know they'll think it's Smurftastic!".

Composition 

"Ooh La La" is a synthpop song. Writing for E! Online, Alexis L. Loinaz described the song as "vintage Britney", with an "oddly folksy pop-tart twist." Melinda Newman of HitFix deemed it a "sweet, slight, little love song" which is about "loving someone for their true blue self." It begins as a "pure pop" song mixed with electronica. The song then transitions, with Spears "speak-singing, Kesha style", over an electroclash beat. This is followed by an acoustic-guitar-driven section, which, according to Newman, is "fluffy, retro pop", similar to Madonna in the early 1980s. "Ooh La La" contains a "compelling breakdown", which is "full of scrambled vocals" and "dense beats", that lasts for a duration of 30 seconds. Spears' "whimsical vocals" contain "catchy ditty layers." Singer Katy Perry revealed during the film's premiere that she, along with co-writer Bonnie McKee, provided some background vocals on the song. The song has been composed in the key of F# Major. It has a BPM of 128 crotchet beats per minute. It follows a chord progression of B-C#-F#-D#m in the chorus.

Critical reception 
"Ooh La La" received generally positive response from critics. Rolling Stones Dan Reilly highlighted the song's catchiness, writing "now that you've heard it, try and get it out of your head". An editor from Billboard magazine described the track as a "sweet spot of sugary synth-pop", adding that the song is "highlighted by a compelling breakdown, full of scrambled vocals and dense beats." Brian Mansfield of USA Today stated that "Momma Spears' kid-friendly track is energetic to the point of hyperactivity, caroming from a rap section to an acoustic-guitar-driven chorus to a buzzy electronic breakdown. Smurftastic? Maybe." Jenna Hally Rubenstein from MTV News was enthusiastic about the song, describing it as a "bright, sunshiny pop jam that perfectly caters to the Smurfs 2 demographic." A reviewer from Take 40 Australia wrote that "the tune is pure Britney and we are absolutely loving it."

In 2014, "Ooh La La" was nominated for two Radio Disney Music Awards for Best Song That Makes You Smile and Favorite Song from a Movie or a TV Show. The award's ceremony took place on April 26, 2014, with the song winning the award for Best Song That Makes You Smile.

Music video
The music video was filmed in June and was directed by Marc Klasfeld. The video features appearances by Spears' children, Sean Preston and Jayden James Federline, as well as a brief appearance by Spears' niece, Maddie Aldridge. The video premiered on Spears' Vevo channel at 12PM ET on July 11, 2013. MSN Music described the opening scene from the  video as an homage to the video for Janet Jackson's 1986 song "Nasty", stating that "the clip plays out like a more kid-friendly version of Janet Jackson's "Nasty" video, with Spears and her kids taking in a movie when mom is suddenly transported into the on-screen action."

The video features Spears and her son's watching The Smurfs 2 in a theater and as Gargamel zaps Spears, she finds herself in Smurf village singing and dancing with the smurfs. The music video heavily samples clips of the movie.

Track listings

Credits and personnel 
Credited personnel list adapted from track info on Tidal.

 Britney Spears – vocals
 Katy Perry – backing vocals (uncredited)
 Kandice Melonakos – composer, lyricist
 Fransisca Hall – composer, lyricist
 Jacob Kasher Hindlin – composer, lyricist
 Bonnie McKee – composer, lyricist
 Henry Walter – composer, lyricist, producer, programmer
 Lukasz Gottwald – composer, lyricist, producer, programmer
 Joshua Coleman – composer, lyricist, producer, programmer
 Emily Wright – engineer
 Clint Gibbs – engineer
 John Hanes – engineer

Charts

Release history

References

2013 singles
Britney Spears songs
RCA Records singles
The Smurfs music
Songs written for films
Song recordings produced by Ammo (record producer)
Song recordings produced by Cirkut (record producer)
Song recordings produced by Dr. Luke
Songs written by Bonnie McKee
Songs written by Jacob Kasher
American synth-pop songs
Music videos directed by Marc Klasfeld
Songs written by Cirkut (record producer)
Songs written by Fransisca Hall